The 1953 Miami Redskins football team was an American football team that represented Miami University in the Mid-American Conference (MAC) during the 1953 college football season. In its third season under head coach Ara Parseghian, Miami compiled a 7–1–1 record (3–0–1 against MAC opponents), finished in second place in the MAC, held eight of nine opponents to seven points or less, and outscored all opponents by a combined total of 327 to 52.

Tom Pagna was the team captain.  The team's statistical leaders included Tom Pagna with 706 rushing yards, Dick Hunter with 626 passing yards, and Jay Ansel with 184 receiving yards.

Schedule

References

Miami
Miami RedHawks football seasons
Miami Redskins football